Mohamed Sayed Srour (born ) is an Egyptian male artistic gymnast, representing his nation at international competitions.  He participated at the 2008 Summer Olympics in Beijing, China.

Olympic results

References

1986 births
Living people
Place of birth missing (living people)
Gymnasts at the 2008 Summer Olympics
Olympic gymnasts of Egypt
Egyptian male artistic gymnasts
21st-century Egyptian people